Events from the year 1309 in Ireland.

Incumbent
Lord: Edward II

Events

Births

Deaths
 Thomas Cantock, Bishop of Emly and Lord Chancellor of Ireland

References

 
1300s in Ireland
Ireland
Years of the 14th century in Ireland